Kumara Kulothungan is a 1939 Indian, Tamil-language film directed by I. Raja Rao The film featured T. R. Rajakumari in the lead role credited as T. R. Rajalakshmi.

Cast 
The list was compiled from the book Thamizh Cinema Ulagam

Male
 C. D. Kannapiran  Kumara Kulothungan
 G. Gopal  Poet Pugazhendhi
 P. Subbaiah Thevar  Poet Ottakoothar
 S. Nandaram  Chozha Commander Ukkirasenan
 T. T. Arasu  Parakrama Pandiyan
 A. Meganathan  Poet Kambar
 P. M. Ummar  Pandiyan Commander
 G. M. Govindasamy  Pandiyan minister
 S. M. Thangaraj  Pandiyan minister
 A. R. Venkataram  Chozha minister
 P. A. Santhanam  Chithreegan
Support cast
 A. R. Ramadas
 V. M. Menon
 K. Govindasamy
 M. S. Murugesan (comedian)
 S. S. Kokko (comedian) (Real name: Pasupuleti Srinivasulu Naidu)

Female
 Rajalakshmi  Buvaneswari
 M. R. Mahalakshmi  Thyagavalli
 M. R. Meenakshi Bai  Pandiyan Queen
 M. K. Hamsaveni  Neelaveni
 N. Varalakshmi  Dancer Kanagavalli
Support cast
 S. Saraswathi
 K. Janaki
 T. M. J. Saradha (comedian)
 C. K. Selvambal (comedian)

Production 
The film was produced by Deccan Cinetone in their own studios at Kilpauk, Chennai. It was directed either by I. Raja Rao OR by R. Dwarakanath. Though the film was produced in 1939 there was no takers at that time. It was released only in 1941 after the success of Kacha Devayani in which T. R. Rajakumari created a sensation. In 1939, T. R. Rajakumari was credited with her real-life name, T. R. Rajaye but when this film was released in 1941, her name was changed as T. R. Rajalakshmi.

In an interview to Ananda Vikatan published on 5 July 1960, T. R. Rajakumari said the film was not released.

Soundtrack  
A. M. Nataraja Mudaliar wrote the lyrics and composed the music. There were 36 songs in the film 5 sung by T. R. Rajakumari. But no trace of any song is available now.

Reception 
Writing in 2014, Randor Guy says the film was a failure at the box-office.

References